The Borg-Warner T-90 is a three-speed manual gearbox manufactured by Borg-Warner. It was used in most Willys and Kaiser-Jeep models from 1945 to 1971, as well as a number of International Harvester models.  It is an improved version of the T-84 used in WWII Willys MB and Ford GPW military Jeeps.  It was constructed with an iron case in both top-shift and side-shift variants.  The gears are spur cut with only 2nd and 3rd gears synchronized.

T-90A
The T-90A was used in Jeep models equipped with a four-cylinder engine.

Applications:
 1945-49 CJ-2A
 1949-53 CJ-3A
 1953-62 CJ-3B
 1946-50 463 Wagon
 1947-50 2T/4T
 1950-62 473/475 4x4
 1950-62 473/475-4WD
 1956-65 FC-150
 1957-65 FC-170
 1961-65 FJ-3/3A

Ratios:
1st..........2.798
2nd..........1.551
3rd..........1.000
Reverse......3.798

T-90C
The T-90C is essentially a T-90A with a 3.339:1 first gear.

Applications:
 1963-68 CJ-3B
 1963-71 CJ-5
 1963-71 CJ-6
 1963-65 475-4WD Truck
 1963-65 475 4x4 Wagon

Ratios:
1st..........3.339
2nd..........1.851
3rd..........1.000
Reverse......4.531

T-90J
The T-90J variant was used in six-cylinder models.

Applications:
 1952-55 685 Wagon
 1954-62 6-226 Truck
 1954-62 6-226 Wagon
 1957-65 FC-170
 1963-65 6-230 Truck
 1963-65 6-230 Wagon
 1963-?? Gladiator
 1963-?? Wagoneer

References

External links
 T-90 Rebuild Guide

90